The Cathedral Church of St Andrew and St Demetrius is a Greek Orthodox cathedral situated on Nicaragua Street in the neighbourhood of Hispanoamérica, district of Chamartín, Madrid, Spain, which belongs to the Orthodox Church of Constantinople. Originally a church, it was granted cathedral status in 2006.

History 
The presence of Greek Orthodoxy in Spain dates back to the late 19th century, when some Greek merchants emigrated to the Iberian Peninsula. In 1949, the Parish of St Andrew the Apostle was founded in the capital city Madrid, under the jurisdiction of the Patriarch of Constantinople. The first stone of the current cathedral was laid in 1971, and construction finished in 1973, the cathedral was inaugurated in the same year. It is built in Byzantine style with a bell tower. Inside, like any other Eastern Orthodox church, an iconostasis with holy door separates the nave from the sanctuary. The interior walls are entirely covered with colourful fresco paintings and elaborate decorative motifs made by Greek artists.

See also 
 Eastern Orthodoxy in Spain
 Greek Orthodox Metropolis of France

References 

Churches in Madrid
Andrew
Greek Orthodox cathedrals in Europe
Madrid Andrew
Churches completed in 1973
Eastern Orthodoxy in Spain
Ecumenical Patriarchate of Constantinople